Fort Ter-Waw is a former US Army fort that was located six miles from the mouth of the Klamath River in the former Klamath River Reservation and in the present town of Klamath Glen, California.

It was a United States military post that was created to guard the Klamath River Reservation and to keep peace between the Tolowa and Yurok Native American tribes and white settlers. It was established in what was then Klamath County, October 12, 1857, by First Lieutenant George Crook and the men of Company D, US 4th Infantry Regiment. The fort was part of the Humboldt Military District headquartered at Fort Humboldt. Most of the fort was destroyed during the Great Flood of 1862 in December 1861 and abandoned June 10, 1862. The garrison was moved to Camp Lincoln.

The site is now in Del Norte County and is marked by a California Historical Landmark (#544). Its location can be found from Hwy 101 taking Ter-Wer Valley exit (Hwy 169), going 3.4 mi to the end of the road, and turning right on Ter-Wer Riffle Road. The site is at the intersection of Ter-Wer Riffle Road and Trinity Way in Klamath Glen.

References

Historic California Posts: Fort Ter-Waw, The California State Military Museum

Closed installations of the United States Army
Ter-Wer
California Historical Landmarks
History of Del Norte County, California
1857 establishments in California